Sir Sean Connery (1930–2020) was a Scottish film actor and producer. He was the first actor to portray the literary character James Bond in a theatrical film, starring in six EON Bond films between 1962 and 1971, and again in another non-EON Bond film in 1983. He was also known for his roles as Jimmy Malone in The Untouchables (1987), for which he won an Academy Award for Best Supporting Actor; Mark Rutland in Marnie (1964); Juan Sánchez Villa-Lobos Ramírez in Highlander (1986); Henry Jones, Sr. in Indiana Jones and the Last Crusade (1989); Captain Marko Aleksandrovich Ramius in The Hunt for Red October (1990); and Allan Quatermain in The League of Extraordinary Gentlemen (2003); Along with his Academy Award, he won two BAFTA Awards, three Golden Globes, and a Henrietta Award.

Film

Television

Theatre

Video games

References

External links
 

Male actor filmographies
British filmographies
Scottish filmographies